Opisthostoma mirabile is a species of air-breathing land snail with an operculum, a terrestrial gastropod mollusk in the family Diplommatinidae.

Distribution 
It is endemic to the Kinabatangan Valley, Sabah, Malaysia. It lives in Borneo.

Its natural habitat is lowland Dipterocarp rainforest. Opisthostoma mirabile is endemic to one limestone outcrop near Suan Lamba known as 'Gomanton Hill'. Subpopulations existed in two smaller limestone outcrops. This species is absent in surrounding non-calcareous regions, and therefore restricted to 1.5 km2 of limestone hills.

Threats 
It is threatened by habitat loss- limestone quarrying has extirpated Opisthostoma mirabile from the two lesser outcrops, and fire near the outcrops has caused forest desiccation which has led to a decline in Prosobranch populations.

References

Diplommatinidae
Endemic fauna of Malaysia
Invertebrates of Borneo
Invertebrates of Malaysia
Taxonomy articles created by Polbot